Georgi Nikolov may refer to:
Georgi Nikolov (footballer born 1937), Bulgarian footballer
Georgi Nikolov (footballer born 1983), Bulgarian footballer
Georgi Nikolov (rower) (born 1938), Bulgarian Olympic rower